Diby may refer to:

People
 Boy Akba Diby (born 1945), Ivorian sprinter
 Charles Koffi Diby (1957–2019), Ivorian politician

Places
 Diby, Estonia